Ray Ryan (born 18 November 1981 in Glanmire, County Cork) is an Irish sportsperson.  He plays hurling with his local club Sarsfields and has represented the Cork senior inter-county team.  He was the captain of the squad called up by Gerald McCarthy to replace the striking 2008 panel.

Ryan comes from a hurling family, and his brother Pat is a former member of the Cork senior panel.  However, Ray did not play inter-county hurling at any level until the age of 27, and was a "hurling nobody" until being called up in the wake of the strike.  In 2006 his club reached the Cork Senior Hurling Championship semi-final and he was named at centre-back on the Cork club team of the year.  He was invited to county team trials but did not make the 2007 squad.  It was not until 2009 that he had the opportunity to play for Cork.  After the 2008 Cork panel refused to play under the management of Gerald McCarthy, Ryan was among the players called up by McCarthy to replace them.  He had won the 2008 Cork Senior Hurling Championship with Sarsfields,  and was one of six Sarsfields players called up by McCarthy.

He was named as the captain for the 2009 National Hurling League.  He is the first captain of Cork from the Sarsfields club in 51 years.  Ryan did well at centre-back for Cork in the opening games of the competition.  Although he was sent off with a yellow card against Dublin in Cork's opening fixture, he impressed against Tipperary in the next game.

Ray Ryan was also selected for Munster hurlers in the Railway Cup in February 2009.  He was one of only two Cork players on the panel.

Ryan admits to experiencing some "moral dilemmas" when agreeing to play with McCarthy's squad and says that he understands the 2008 players' problems, but believes that "What they are doing is not right". He has been criticised by supporters of the 2008 squad for his role in the controversy, sometimes being called "Captain Scab" by them.

References

1986 births
Living people
Sarsfields (Cork) hurlers
Cork inter-county hurlers